François Coupry (19 July 1947, Hyères) is a French writer.

Biography 
After studying philosophy, he was a literary journalist, publisher and editor-in-chief of the magazine Roman (1982–1989), while occupying institutional posts: first director of the Maison des écrivains (1984–1986), president of the Société des gens de lettres (1996–2000), president and co-manager of SOFIA, "Société française des auteurs de l’écrit" (2001–2005, then 2010–2013).

An essayist, storyteller and novelist, he has published some thirty stories in the genre Marvelous, where the world is told from an "abnormal", "inhuman" point of view, and where the ordinary laws and principles of physics have been recreated. His paradoxes and fables question "the role of the creative fiction of reality."

Works

External links 
 Author's website
 L'agonie de Gutenberg (blog)
 François Coupry on Ricochet-jeunes.org
 LE SINGE QUI FAIT LE SINGE
 François Coupry on La cause littéraire
 François Coupry on the site of the Académie française
 François Coupry – L'école des filles 2012 – Françoise Livinec on YouTube

20th-century French novelists
20th-century French male writers
21st-century French novelists
Prix des Deux Magots winners
People from Hyères
1947 births
Living people
21st-century French male writers